Doob may refer to:

 Doob (album), solo album  by Arnob, 2008
 Anthony Doob (born 1943), Canadian criminologist
 Joseph L. Doob (1910–2004), American mathematician